H5, H05 or H-5 may refer to:

Business
 H5 (US company), an American electronic discovery company headquartered in San Francisco, California
 H5 (French company), a French video company

Science
 Influenza A virus subtype H5 (disambiguation), all A type viruses containing H5 type of agglutinin
 Histone H5, a histone similar to Histone H1
 Haplogroup H5 (mtDNA), a genetics subgroup
 ATC code H05 Calcium homeostasis, a subgroup of the Anatomical Therapeutic Chemical Classification System
 British NVC community H5
 Hydrogen-5 (H-5), an isotope of hydrogen
 H05, an ICD-10 code for diseases of the eye and adnexa

Sport
 H5 (classification), a para-cycling classification

Technology
 DSC-H5, a Full-Featured-Camera made by Sony
 H5, a Hurricane tie manufactured by Simpson Strong-Tie Co
 .h5 filename extension used in Hierarchical Data Format
 , level 5 heading markup for HTML web pages

Transportation
 H5 Series Shinkansen, a Japanese Shinkansen high-speed train
 H5 Portway, a road part of the Milton Keynes grid road system, England
 Hola Airlines (IATA code: H5), a former Spanish airline
 Magadan Airlines (IATA code: H5), a former Russian airline

Military
 HMS H5, a 1918 British Royal Navy H-class submarine
 HMS Greyhound (H05), a 1935 British Royal Navy G-class destroyer
 HMS Ithuriel (H05), a 1940 British Royal Navy I-class destroyer
 H-5, a Chinese manufactured variant of the Soviet Ilyushin Il-28 jet bomber
 Sikorsky H-5, a helicopter
 USS H-5 (SS-148), a 1918 United States Navy submarine

See also
 Hydrogen-5 (5H), an unstable isotope of hydrogen
 Harrison Number Five, a 1773 marine chronometer designed by John Harrison
 5H (disambiguation)